Marian Ursula Arkwright (1863 – March 1922) was an English composer.

Life
Marian Arkwright was born in Norwich, Norfolk, England, and received a doctorate in music at Durham University, one of the first English women to do so. After completing her studies, she worked as an orchestra musician and composer and conducted orchestras including the Newbury Amateur Orchestral Society. She served as secretary of the English Ladies' Orchestral Union. She received a prize from The Gentlewoman for an original orchestral work The Winds of the World.

Works
Arkwright was noted for unusual instrument combinations. Selected works include:

Quintet for piano, oboe, clarinet, horn and bassoon
Trio for piano, oboe and horn 
Trio for pianoforte, oboe and viola 
Scherzo and Variations for piano, clarinet and bassoon
Rêveries for piano, oboe and viola

She published three volumes of violin and piano duets and two Concert Pieces for viola and piano. She took an interest in folk music and her Japanese Symphony contained airs that she had noted down herself.

She died unexpectedly in March 1922.

References

1863 births
1922 deaths
English classical musicians
Women classical composers
Composers from Norwich
Alumni of Durham University